Kremenchuk Raion (translit.: Kremenchutskyi raion) is a raion (district) in Poltava Oblast of central Ukraine. The raion's administrative center is the city of Kremenchuk. Population: 

On 18 July 2020, as part of the administrative reform of Ukraine, the number of raions of Poltava Oblast was reduced to four, and the area of Kremenchuk Raion was significantly expanded.  The January 2020 estimate of the raion population was 

Important rivers within the Kremenchutskyi Raion include the Psel and the Dnieper. The raion was established in 1939.

Settlements

References

Raions of Poltava Oblast
Kremenchuk
1939 establishments in Ukraine